The Family is a 1987 Italian film directed by Ettore Scola and starring Vittorio Gassman, Fanny Ardant, Philippe Noiret, and Stefania Sandrelli. It was entered into the 1987 Cannes Film Festival.

Plot
The film depicts a bourgeois Italian family seen through the eyes of Carlo, an old retired professor who is the last patriarch of his family. 
The memoirs of Carlo characterize the entire film, from the time of the Belle Époque until the 1980s, through two world wars, the economic boom, love, friendship, and all the events which constitute human life.

The film unfolds all around the apartment bought by the grandfather of Carlo. 
It shows the family, its dynastic succession, and its many traditions.

Cast
 Vittorio Gassman - Carlo as a man / Carlo's grandfather
 Stefania Sandrelli - Beatrice as a woman
 Andrea Occhipinti - Carlo as a young man  
 Fanny Ardant - Adriana as a woman
 Philippe Noiret - Jean Luc 
 Carlo Dapporto - Giulio as a man 
 Massimo Dapporto - Giulio as a boy 
 Sergio Castellitto - Carletto
 Ricky Tognazzi - Paolino
 Ottavia Piccolo - Adelina 
 Athina Cenci - Aunt Margherita
 Emanuele Lamaro - Carlo as a child 
 Cecilia Dazzi - Beatrice as a girl 
 Jo Champa - Adriana as a young woman 
 Joska Versari - Giulio as a child 
 Alberto Gimignani - Giulio as a boy 
 Dagmar Lassander - Marika

Awards
The film won five David di Donatello awards, six Nastro d'Argento awards, and it was an Academy Award nominee as Best Foreign Language film.

See also
 List of submissions to the 60th Academy Awards for Best Foreign Language Film
 List of Italian submissions for the Academy Award for Best Foreign Language Film

References

External links
 
 

1987 films
1987 drama films
Italian drama films
French drama films
1980s Italian-language films
Films set in Rome
Films directed by Ettore Scola
Films about families
Films set in the 20th century
Films with screenplays by Ruggero Maccari
Films scored by Armando Trovajoli
Films with screenplays by Ettore Scola
Belle Époque
1980s Italian films
1980s French films